Menasha is a city in Calumet and Winnebago counties in the U.S. state of Wisconsin. The population was 18,268 at the 2020 census. Of this, 15,144 were in Winnebago County, and 2,209 were in Calumet County. The city is located mostly in Winnebago County; only a small portion is in the Town of Harrison in Calumet County. Doty Island is located partially in Menasha. The city's name comes from the Winnebago word meaning "thorn" or "island". In the Menominee language, it is known as Menāēhsaeh, meaning "little island". Menasha is home to the Barlow Planetarium and Weis Earth Science Museum, both housed at the University of Wisconsin-Oshkosh, Fox Cities Campus.

Geography
Menasha is located at  (44.2129, −88.4362).

Demographics
Menasha is a city in the Appleton–Oshkosh–Neenah CSA, a Combined Statistical Area which includes the Appleton (Calumet and Outagamie counties) and Oshkosh–Neenah (Winnebago County) metropolitan areas, which had a combined population of 392,660 at the 2010 census and an estimated population of 409,881 as of 2019.

2020 census
At the 2020 census there were 18,268 people residing in the city. The racial makeup of the city was 85.9% White, 1.8% African American, 1.3% Native American, 3.1% Asian, 0.1% Pacific Islander, 3.0% from other races, and 4.7% from two or more races. Hispanic or Latino of any race were 7.2%.

2010 census
At the 2010 census there were 17,353 people, 7,405 households, and 4,415 families living in the city. The racial makeup of the city was 90.8% White, 1.2% African American, 0.7% Native American, 2.2% Asian, 0.1% Pacific Islander, 3.0% from other races, and 2.1% from two or more races. Hispanic or Latino of any race were 6.9%.

Of the 7,405 households 30.7% had children under the age of 18 living with them, 43.6% were married couples living together, 10.9% had a female householder with no husband present, 5.1% had a male householder with no wife present, and 40.4% were non-families. 32.2% of households were one person and 9.9% were one person aged 65 or older. The average household size was 2.32 and the average family size was 2.95.

The median age was 36 years. 24.8% of residents were under the age of 18; 8.2% were between the ages of 18 and 24; 29.1% were from 25 to 44; 26.4% were from 45 to 64; and 11.6% were 65 or older. The gender makeup of the city was 49.4% male and 50.6% female.

2000 census
At the 2000 census there were 16,331 people, 6,951 households, and 4,233 families living in the city. The population density was 3,106.9 people per square mile (1,198.8/km). There were 7,271 housing units at an average density of 1,383.3 per square mile (533.7/km).  The racial makeup of the city was 94.80% White, 0.54% African American, 0.61% Native American, 1.62% Asian, 0.02% Pacific Islander, 1.38% from other races, and 1.04% from two or more races. Hispanic or Latino of any race were 3.61%.

Of the 6,951 households 31.7% had children under the age of 18 living with them, 46.1% were married couples living together, 10.8% had a female householder with no husband present, and 39.1% were non-families. 31.8% of households were one person and 10.0% were one person aged 65 or older. The average household size was 2.35 and the average family size was 2.99.

The age distribution was 25.6% under the age of 18, 9.6% from 18 to 24, 33.6% from 25 to 44, 19.4% from 45 to 64, and 11.8% 65 or older. The median age was 34 years. For every 100 females, there were 96.7 males. For every 100 females age 18 and over, there were 93.4 males.

The median household income was $39,936 and the median family income  was $47,401. Males had a median income of $36,705 versus $25,176 for females. The per capita income for the city was $20,743. About 5.4% of families and 6.5% of the population were below the poverty line, including 8.5% of those under age 18 and 8.2% of those age 65 or over.

Government 
The city of Menasha has a city council-mayor system of government. There are eight districts in the city, each represented by an aldermen. The council meets weekly with the mayor, Don Merkes.

Religion

The Wisconsin Evangelical Lutheran Synod (WELS) has two churches in Menasha: Bethel Lutheran Church and Mount Calvary Lutheran Church.

Architect Harry Weese designed Menasha's St Thomas' Episcopal Church.

Education

 Elementary schools
 Clovis Grove Elementary School
 Gegan Elementary School
 Nicolet Elementary School
 Jefferson Elementary School
 Banta Elementary School
 Butte des Morts Elementary School
 Trinity Lutheran School
 Bethel Lutheran School
 St. Mary Catholic Elementary School
 Junior high/middle schools
 Maplewood Middle School
 Trinity Lutheran School
 Bethel Lutheran School
 High schools
 Menasha High School
 Fox Valley Alternative School
 Colleges and universities
 University of Wisconsin–Oshkosh, Fox Cities Campus

Economy

Companies headquartered in Menasha 

 Faith Technologies

Tourism 

Tourists visiting Menasha often go to Heckrodt Wetland Reserve, a 91-acre urban nature reserve with habitats including forested wetland, cattail marsh, open water, created prairie, open field, and upland forest. The University of Wisconsin-Oshkosh, Fox Cities Campus houses the Weis Earth Science Museum, The Official Mineralogical Museum of Wisconsin; The Barlow Planetarium, The First Major Planetarium in Wisconsin; and the Communication Arts Center, a 51,000 square foot facility academic building with an art gallery and theatrical/musical performances.

Parks/Trails 
The City of Menasha contains 7 neighborhood parks, 2 community parks, 2 Mini-parks, and 11 special purpose parks. The City of Menasha also has a public pool located in Jefferson Park.

Smith Park is the oldest park in the Menasha Park system. The park celebrated its 100-year anniversary in 1997, making it one of the oldest city parks in the state. 

Several unique features make Smith Park an attraction worth seeing and an important community asset. A railroad caboose, presented to the Menasha Historical Society, commemorates the fact that Menasha was the birthplace of the original Wisconsin Central Railroad. At the southern end of the park are several Native American burial mounds - large settlements of Fox and Winnebago Native Americans once inhabited the area - and a natural amphitheater used for summer concerts. The north end of the park features semi-formal gardens planted each year with approximately 6,000 annuals, a setting that is a favorite for summer weddings. A gazebo funded with corporate donations was built in this area in 1997.

Menasha has many public trails for bikes/pedestrians. One of the most used, Loop the Little Lake is a 3.5 mile route that links three (3) communities (Village of Fox Crossing, City of Menasha and City of Neenah).

Friendly cities 
  Maebashi, Japan

Notable people

 Joseph H. Anderson, legislator
 John A. Bryan, U.S. diplomat
 Silas Bullard, jurist and legislator
 Elmer J. Burr, Medal of Honor recipient
 Arnold J. Cane, jurist and legislator
 Connie Clausen, television and Broadway actress, literary agent, and author of "I Love You Honey but The Season's Over", a memoir about Menasha
 Jean Pond Miner Coburn, sculptor
 Samuel A. Cook, U.S. Representative
 John Dollard, psychologist
 William Duchman, legislator and sawmill operator
 A. D. Eldridge, legislator and businessman
 William P. Grimes, legislator and businessman
 Eric Hinske, hitting coach for the Arizona Diamondbacks and former American League Rookie of the Year
 Joan Jaykoski, baseball player
 James C. Kerwin, Wisconsin Supreme Court
 Dave Koslo, MLB player for the New York Giants, Baltimore Orioles, and the Milwaukee Braves
 Jean Kraft, opera singer
 Publius Virgilius Lawson, six-term mayor, historian, manufacturer, lawyer
 George Liberace, musician and television performer, older brother of Liberace
 Jeff Loomis, heavy metal guitarist
 Thomas J. O'Malley, Lieutenant Governor of Wisconsin
 Curtis Reed, mayor of Menasha, businessman
 Richard J. Steffens, legislator
 Leslie J. Westberg, U.S. Air Force brigadier general
 Tony Wons, radio actor and commentator in the 1920s and 1930s; born in Menasha

References

External links

 City of Menasha
 

Cities in Wisconsin
Cities in Winnebago County, Wisconsin
Cities in Calumet County, Wisconsin
Appleton–Fox Cities metropolitan area